Colin Chris Stüssi (born 4 June 1993) is a Swiss cyclist, who currently rides for UCI Continental team .

Major results
2013
 2nd Road race, National Under-23 Road Championships
2015
 3rd Giro del Friuli Venezia Giulia
2017
 1st  Overall Tour of Rhodes
1st Stage 1
 2nd Overall Sibiu Cycling Tour
 4th Famenne Ardenne Classic
 8th Overall Tour du Gévaudan Languedoc-Roussillon
2018
 6th Overall Tour of Almaty
2019
 1st Stage 2 Tour de Savoie Mont Blanc
 1st  Mountains classification, Tour of Rhodes
 4th Paris–Bourges
2020
 2nd  Mountains classification, Tour of Rhodes
2022
 3rd Road race, National Road Championships

References

External links

 
 
 
 Official website of Colin Stüssi

1993 births
Living people
Swiss male cyclists
People from Glarus